Scott Patterson (born December 23, 1961) is a Canadian athlete who has appeared in four Paralympic Games in three different sports.

Patterson is a double leg amputee injured in a work accident in 1982. He competed in four events in track athletics in the 1988 Summer Paralympics in Seoul, South Korea, his best result being fifth.

His next appearance was not until the 2002 Winter Paralympics in Salt Lake City, where he entered 3 alpine skiing events, winning a bronze medal in the Men's giant slalom LW12. He skied again in 2006 in Torino, but his best result was a 20th place.

In the 2012 Summer Paralympics in London he appeared for the first time as a swimmer, taking 8th place in the final of the 100 metre breaststroke SB5.

References

 Scott Patterson - Profile - Canadian Paralympic Committee

1961 births
Living people
Athletes from Vancouver
Canadian male alpine skiers
Paralympic track and field athletes of Canada
Paralympic alpine skiers of Canada
Paralympic swimmers of Canada
Skiers from Vancouver
Swimmers from Vancouver
Athletes (track and field) at the 1988 Summer Paralympics
Alpine skiers at the 2002 Winter Paralympics
Alpine skiers at the 2006 Winter Paralympics
Swimmers at the 2012 Summer Paralympics
Paralympic bronze medalists for Canada
Paralympic medalists in alpine skiing
Medalists at the 2002 Winter Paralympics
Canadian male breaststroke swimmers